Mottisfont is a village and civil parish in the Test Valley district of Hampshire, England, approximately 7 km north west of Romsey.  The village is best known as the location of Mottisfont Abbey. Much of the surrounding land, which is part of the Mottisfont Estate, and several other buildings in the village, are in the care of the National Trust.

The unusual name is probably derived from the Old English motes funta, meaning 'spring near the confluence' or 'spring of the moot' or possibly 'spring of the stone' (from the Old English motere: sonte).

Mottisfont formerly had a railway station on the Sprat and Winkle Line, which closed in the 1960s. The nearby Dunbridge station on the Wessex Main Line has recently been renamed as Mottisfont and Dunbridge. The Test Way and Monarch's Way long-distance footpaths pass through the village.

References

Villages in Hampshire
Civil parishes in Hampshire